The 2018–19 FIS Cross-Country Nor-Am Cup was a season of the Nor-Am Cup, a Continental Cup season in cross-country skiing for men and women. The season began on 8 December 2018 in Vernon, British Columbia, Canada and concluded on 3 February 2019 in Duntroon, Ontario, Canada.

Calendar

Men

Women

Overall standings

Men's overall standings

Women's overall standings

References

External links
2018–19 Overall Standing Men
2018–19 Overall Standing Women

Nor-Am Cup
FIS Cross-Country Nor-Am Cup seasons
2018 in cross-country skiing
2019 in cross-country skiing